Horned spurge is a common name for several plants and may refer to:

Euphorbia brachycera, native to western North America
Euphorbia cornigera, native to Bhutan and cultivated as an ornamental